Daniela Hantuchová and Ai Sugiyama were the defending champions but decided not to defend the title together. Hantuchová chose to play with Nadia Petrova while Sugiyama played with Katarina Srebotnik. Both lost in the second round. Nathalie Dechy and Mara Santangelo won the title by defeating Tathiana Garbin and Roberta Vinci 6–4, 6–1 in the final.

Seeds
The top five seeds received a bye into the second round.

Draw

Finals

Top half

Bottom half

References
 
 

Italian Open - Doubles
Women's Doubles